Adam Paul Tinley (born 4 December 1967), known professionally as Adamski, as well as Sonny Eriksson, is an English DJ, musician, singer and record producer, prominent at the time of acid house for his tracks "N-R-G" and "Killer", a collaboration with Seal, which was a No. 1 song in the UK in 1990.

Career
Tinley was born in Lymington, Hampshire, England. As a youngster, influenced by punk rock and John Peel, he formed his first band The Stupid Babies when he was 11 and living in New Forest in England. He persuaded his 5-year-old brother Dominic to sing while he strummed a small guitar, and sent a demo tape to the indie label Fast Product, run by The Human League's manager Bob Last. "Everyone thought that was a really precocious and strange thing for an 11 year-old to do," Adamski recalls "but I just thought that's what everybody did". The kiddie-punk tracks were released on a sampler. When alternative BBC Radio 1 DJ John Peel started playing their song "Babysitters" the band caused quite a stir, receiving positive write-ups in music magazines like Smash Hits and Melody Maker. He performed with his brother Mark Tinley, and Johnny Slut of the band Specimen, as Diskord Datkord. They released their only single in 1988, an electroid cover of "Identity" by punk band X-Ray Spex. It was single of the week in NME.

In March 1989, Adamski was booked for his first solo gig at Le Petit Prince Restaurant in Kentish Town, run by his manager Phil Smith. Lenny D, promoter of nightclub Heaven, happened to be walking past, and was convinced by Smith to book Adamski for an all-dayer at Heaven. He quickly catapulted into the upper echelons of the nascent rave scene. Within a few weeks, Adamski was playing to 8,000 people at Sunrise Festival at Santa Pod Raceway and, after a bidding war, signed to MCA Records, producing the first rave record on MCA called Liveandirect.

He had success with this first release, which was a collection of tracks recorded live at various raves. It contained a short, live version of his first single "N-R-G", as well as "I Dream of You", which appeared on a free 4-track 7" vinyl single given away with the music paper Record Mirror  in 1989.  The cover of the single "N-R-G" featured a mocked up Lucozade bottle with the word "Lucozade" replaced with "N-R-G".

Adamski toured many clubs with his portable keyboard set up, playing long sets, with an MC, Daddy Chester, and later with Seal. In front of his keyboard was a UK car number plate with the word ADAMSKI on it.  Early versions of future singles "Killer" and "Future Love Paradise" were played on some of the Seal dates.

The album, Adamski's Thing, was issued in late 1998 on Trevor Horn's ZTT Records label, recorded at Adrian Sherwood’s On-U Sound studios. The style followed the trend started with his 1992 album Naughty, with guitars, strings, raw vocals and introspective lyrics, but maintaining a rhythmic dance sensibility. Adamski's Thing spawned two singles, "Intravenous Venus" and "One of the People" (a record featuring dance vocalist Gerideau, that got to No. 56 in the UK Singles Chart).

Throughout the late 90s Tinley shifted focus to his DJ career. He soon adopted a new moniker, Adam Sky, touring Europe, and making the odd UK appearance such as playing at seminal electroclash night Nag Nag Nag in London in 2002 – run by his old friend Jonny Slut. 

As a producer, his songs at that time also included a collaboration with musician Danny Williams. In 2007, he released a remake of The Pop Group's 1979 single "We Are All Prostitutes" with Mark Stewart which appeared on a number of compilations. His single "ApeX" was released on Kitsuné Music in 2006. In 2009, he began to release more material on Shir Khan's record label.

In 2009 he found his way back to the UK to start his Futurewaltz project, working in the 3/4 time signature.

Tinley’s latest alter ego is cyberbilly Sonny Eriksson - a self-styled Teddy Boy fusing rockabilly and psychobilly styles with the hypnotic, strange and electronic sounds of today and beyond.

In 2020 Adamski released Free To Kill Again, featuring 10 new interpretations of his classic track ‘Killer' with guest features by Boy George, Nina Hagen, Adrian Sherwood, Mykki Blanco, Hannah Hu and more.

In 2022 Adamski released Black Butterfly, featuring legendary house singer Robert Owens. The track is a tribute to Mina Smallman’s daughters Nicole and Bibaa, with all proceeds donated to the charity Million Women Rise. Remixes by Captain Mustache, Leeroy Thornhil (The Prodigy), Mr. C (Superfreq), and Shadow Child.

In October 2022 Adamski released Black Star Acid (Boys Noize Records)

Discography

Albums
 Liveandirect (1989)  –   UK No. 47
 Doctor Adamski's Musical Pharmacy (1990) – UK No. 8
 Naughty (1992)
 Adamski vs The Sentinels (1993)
 Adamski's Thing (1998)
 Killer – The Best of Adamski (1999)
 Mutant Pop (1999)
 This is 3-Step EP (2014)
 Revolt (2015)
 The Sound of Sonny Eriksson (2017)
 The Spirit of Sonny Eriksson (EP) (2018)
  Re:nrgise (2019)
 Free to Kill Again (2020)

Singles

Remixes
 Miss Kittin and The Hacker – "Stock Exchange" (2003)
 Mignon – "Demons of Love" (2004)
 ESKA – "She's in the Flowers" (2015)

References

External links

 
 [ Adamski biography at Allmusic]
  
 ZTT Records official site
 Ian Peel: Warriors of pop, 21 years of ZTT Record Collector, September 2004 (copy at Zang Tuum Tumb and all that) Article about ZTT's history, contains info on Adamski
 Interview with Kool magazine

1967 births
Acid house musicians
English electronic musicians
English house musicians
English record producers
English techno musicians
English dance musicians
English male singers
English DJs
Living people
MCA Records artists
ZTT Records artists
People from Lymington
Kitsuné artists
Electronic dance music DJs